James Crossley (born 1973/1974) is an English bodybuilder and television personality. He appeared as Hunter in the sports entertainment series Gladiators from 1993 to 2000. Most recently he appeared in the third series of the Channel 4 reality series The Circle.

Life and career
Crossley appeared in the ITV game show Gladiators as “Hunter” for 7 years from 1993 to the shows final episode on 1 January 2000. Often regarded by contenders as the shows most formidable Gladiator this was proven when he was crowned The Ultimate Gladiator after a showdown with the other male UK Gladiators in The Battle Of The Giants special in the shows penultimate final episode. While appearing on the series, he dislocated his shoulder six times.

He returned to the format in the Sky reboot of Gladiators in 2008 appearing in the first “legends” special, which pitted the new Gladiators against some members of the original team. He also hosted some online items for the show such as fronting interviews with the new generation of Gladiators and hosting additional backstage content.

Post Gladiators Crossley toured numerous theatre productions including Sir Peter Halls Shakespeare production of As You Like It.  In May 2018, he broke the world record for lifting the Dinnie Stones.

A Fit At 40 campaigner in 2018 Crossley released a fitness DVD to help over 40s get in shape 
In 2021, he competed in the third series of the Channel 4 reality series The Circle. He played as a catfish persona - NHS nurse Gemma, and pledged to donate half of the prize fund to the NHS if he won. He received mixed views from viewers for pretending to work for the NHS.

Crossley now works as a strength & conditioning coach whilst teaching yoga and running gong bath meditations.

References

External links
 

1970s births
English bodybuilders
Gladiators (1992 British TV series)
Living people
Sportspeople from York
Television personalities from Yorkshire